This is a list of number-one hit singles in 1972 in New Zealand, starting with the first chart dated, 14 January 1972.

Chart

External links
 The Official NZ Music Chart, RIANZ website

1972 in New Zealand
1972 record charts
1972
1970s in New Zealand music